Plamen Penev (born 24 July 1975) is a Bulgarian wrestler. He competed in the men's freestyle 82 kg at the 1996 Summer Olympics.

References

1975 births
Living people
Bulgarian male sport wrestlers
Olympic wrestlers of Bulgaria
Wrestlers at the 1996 Summer Olympics
People from Yambol